Boomtown is a podcast about big oil in the Permian Basin hosted by Christian Wallace and produced by Texas Monthly in partnership with Imperative Entertainment.

Background 
The show was produced by Texas Monthly in partnership with Imperative Entertainment, and syndicated on Marfa Public Radio. The show debuted on December 10, 2019 with Jason Hoch as the executive producer of the show. Boomtown is a narrative serialized show about the 21st century Texas oil boom that occurred in the Permian Basin. Christian Wallace—the host of the show—grew up in Andrews, Texas and previously spent a year as a roughneck in the oilfields working on drilling rigs. The first episode of the ten part series is about U.S. Route 285 in Texas known as "Death Highway" or the "Highway to Hell" because the traffic from tank trucks carrying oil has increased the number of deaths by 67% since the beginning of the oil boom.

At the end of each episode Wallace discloses that "Texas Monthly's parent company also owns interests in the midstream oil and gas industry among other diversified investments. Our editorial judgements are made independently of any such investments."

Reception 
In January of 2020, CBS7 reported that the show hit number one on the iTunes and Spotify charts and had stayed within the top twenty documentary podcasts.

Laura Jane Standley and Eric McQuade of The Atlantic included the show on their list of the "50 Best Podcasts of 2020" saying that the "show is a beautiful ride filled with levity, even as it delivers troubling forecasts for the future." Erin Berger of Outside commented on the show saying that "Boomtown ... prove[s] that good storytelling about devastating environmental issues is still vitally important, informative, and inspiring." David Leffler of Austin Monthly called the show "Compelling, illuminating, and gripping."

Awards

Adaptation 
In February 2022, Paramount+ ordered a television series adaptation of Boomtown titled Land Man from screenwriter Taylor Sheridan.  Billy Bob Thornton plans to star in the series.

References

External links 

 on the host's website

Audio podcasts
2019 podcast debuts
2020 podcast endings
Interview podcasts
Audio documentaries
Texas culture
Environmental podcasts